Port Neches–Groves High School (PNG) is located in Port Neches, Texas. It is the only high school in the Port Neches-Groves Independent School District and serves portions of Port Neches, Groves, and Port Arthur. It was built in 1925.

History
Port Neches High School, the predecessor to Port Neches–Groves High School, was built in 1925 at a cost of approximately $175,000. The Indian mascot and the purple and white school colors were chosen around this time.

The Indianettes dance team was founded in 1951, with the marching band, "Indian Spirit" mascot, and adoption of the fight song "Cherokee" being implemented over the following decade. A student serving as the drum major, Lynne James née Jeffrey, wrote the lyrics to the fight song. She later became the principal of Port Neches Middle School in the early 2000s.

The current Port Neches High School on Merriman Street was first used in 1953, with the original high school building becoming Port Neches Junior High. The current name of the school was adopted in 1956.

Athletics

Mascot controversy

The high school's "Indian" mascot has garnered controversy for being racist and culturally insensitive, in line with a greater trend in the United States. These depictions include the use of the chant "Scalp 'Em", referring to the school's football field as "the reservation", and cheerleaders crafting and wearing ersatz war bonnets, among others. No residents of Port Neches or Groves identify as solely American Indian. The school administration has repeatedly stated they would not change their traditions or mascot, including turning down a general offer from Adidas to provide free design resources and financial assistance to change the imagery.

In 2020, the Cherokee Nation called for the school to discontinue its use of the mascot. This was a change from a 1979 certificate from then-Principal Chief Ross Swimmer recognizing the high school as "ambassadors of goodwill," with the Principal Chief of the Cherokee Nation Chuck Hoskin Jr. stating that the mascot and imagery "perpetuate inaccurate misconceptions of Native American culture and invokes ideations of savagery which only perpetuates harmful stereotypes and inaccurately depicts our culture."

In March 2022, the school's "Indianettes" drill team chanted the phrase "Scalp 'Em" during a performance at Walt Disney World's Magic Kingdom after being told they would not be allowed to wear their war bonnets. Disney released a statement condemning the performance and stating the Indianettes had not been in the school's audition tape.  In the wake of the controversy, the Cherokee Nation renewed its demand that the high school drop the mascot and end its Indian-related traditions.  Principal Chief Hoskin stated "I can tell you no Chief of the Cherokee Nation, whether it's me or whether it dates back to Chief Swimmer who served in the late 70s to the early 80s would condone the kind of imagery or depiction of Native peoples that we see PNG not only do, but stubbornly refuse to even consider that those displays are offensive," he said. "They're not authentic. They have no connection to the Cherokee people, in fact, in many ways make a mockery of our wonderful and beautiful traditions." Hoskin's statement was echoed by the Vice-Chair of the Alabama-Coushatta Tribe of Texas, whose original lands would have included the area of Port Neches. The high school has deleted many of its social media accounts.

State championships
Football
1953(3A), 1955(3A), 1975(4A)
Volleyball
1972(4A), 1979(4A), 1981(5A)

Notable alumni
Greg Davis, former offensive coordinator, University of Texas
Andrew Dismukes, Saturday Night Live cast member
Lew Ford, Major League Baseball player
L.Q. Jones, actor
Wade Phillips, defensive coordinator, Denver Broncos; former head coach, Dallas Cowboys
Ben Weber, Pitcher, Los Angeles Angels; World Series Champion, Los Angeles Angels

See also
 List of sports team names and mascots derived from indigenous peoples

References

External links
 

High schools in Jefferson County, Texas
Public high schools in Texas